Anna Helena Dorothea Nielsen, née Brenöe, (September 4, 1803 – July 20, 1856), was a Danish stage actress and opera singer (mezzo-soprano). She was one of the most famous female stage artists in Denmark of her time. She was a mentor for many talents, such as for example Louise Phister and her private home was a center of the theatre world.

Biography
Born in Copenhagen to the compass-maker Peter Christian Brenøe and Olave Frederikke Caroline Leth. She was educated in a girls' school until her father was ruined, and was a member in the drama society there. She was also a student of a master of the chapel at the Royal Danish Theatre. She was a tall and blue-eyed blonde. She was accepted as a student at the theatre, where she was given Johanne Rosing as her mentor.

She was described as versatile, with a fine singing voice, vivid, and recommended for her natural, sensitive and poetic way of acting, her best interpretation were repressed but strong emotion. Initially much used for the leading roles of heroine, she eventually performed all sorts of parts. She was active on stage until her death. As was common in her time and place, she was active within both opera and theatre. She played heroine in both theatre and opera, often in the part of "Nordic maiden". She was famed for her parts in the work of Adam Oehlenschläger, and contributed to the breakthrough for the vaudevilles of J. L. Heiberg. Søren Kierkegaard called her an interpreter of femininity. She was one of the strongest speakers in favour of a realistic way of acting at the theatre.

She was married in 1823 to the Norwegian violinist Frederik Thorkildsen Wexschall, (separated in 1831) and in 1834 to the actor Peder Nielsen and had one daughter. The fact that she divorced her second spouse in order to marry another was considered scandalous.

List of roles

1820s
 1821	De lystige passagerer as Constance
 1821	Dyveke as Dyveke
 1821	Falsk undseelse as Emmy
 1821	Nonnerne as Euphemia
 1821	Ringen as Henriette von Darring
 1822	Bagtalelsens skole as Maria
 1822	Barselstuen as Stine Isenkræmmers
 1822	Den politiske kandestøber as Raadsherreinde
 1822	Herman Von Unna as Ida
 1822	Medbejlerne as Nancy Ømling
 1822	Ulysses von Ithacia as Juno
 1823	Bagtalelsens skole as Maria
 1823	Barselstuen as Stine Isenkræmmers
 1823	Den politiske kandestøber as Raadsherreinde
 1823	Det stille vand har den dybe grund as Baronesse von Holmbach, rig ung enke
 1823	Dyveke as Dyveke, Christians elskede
 1823	Nonnerne as Euphemia
 1823	Ulysses von Ithacia as Juno
 1824	Barselstuen as 	Stine Isenkræmmers
 1824	De lystige passagerer as Constance
 1824	De to dage as Constance
 1824	De to poststationer as Angelique
 1824	Hekseri as Terentia, Leanders fæstemø
 1825	Bagtalelsens skole as Maria
 1825	Barberen i Sevilla as Rosine
 1825	Høstgildet as Anna
 1826	Bagtalelsens skole as Maria
 1826	Entreprenøren i knibe as Merline
 1826	Ringen as Henriette von Darring
 1826	Sovedrikken as Charlotte
 1827	Bagtalelsens skole as Maria
 1827	Barselstuen as Ingeborg Blytækkers
 1827	De to poststationer as Angelique
 1827	Gert Westphaler as Leonora
 1828	Peters bryllup as Anna
 1829	Bagtalelsens skole as Maria

1830s
 1830	Bagtalelsens skole as Maria
 1830	Lønkammeret as Cecile
 1831	Balders død as Nanna
 1831	Barselstuen as Ingeborg Blytækkers
 1831	Pigen fra Mrienborg as Cathinka
 1831	Ringen as Ubekendt
 1832	Bagtalelsens skole as Maria
 1833	Barselstuen as Frue
 1833	Den sorte mand as Mistress, Johnsons kone
 1834	Dyveke as Dyveke, Christians elskede
 1834	Figaros giftermaal as Grevinden
 1834	Niels Ebbesen af Nørreris as Jutta
 1835	Barselstuen as Ingeborg Blytækkers
 1835	Machbeth as Lady Macbeth
 1835	Herman Von Unna as Sophia
 1835	Ulysses von Ithacia as Juno
 1836	Den skinsyge kone as Mistress Oakley
 1836	Emilie Galotti as Grevinde Orsina
 1837	De fire formyndere as Madam Prim

1840s
 1843	Macbeth as Lady Macbeth
 1844	Jægerne as Madam Warberger
 1844	Kalifen af Bagdad as Enke
 1845	Romeo og Julie as Fru Capulet
 1846	Bagtalelsens skole as Mistress Candour
 1846	Den adelige borger as Madame Jourdain
 1847	Macbeth as Lady Macbeth

1850s
 1850	Naar enden er god	Rousillon
 1851	'''Hamlet as Gertrud
 1856	Kongens læge'' as Grevinden af Rousillon

References
 Europas konstnärer
 Dansk kvindebiografisk leksikon

1803 births
1856 deaths
19th-century Danish actresses
Danish operatic mezzo-sopranos
Danish stage actresses
19th-century Danish women opera singers
Singers from Copenhagen